, formerly , or NOC or Shin-Nisseki (新日石) is a Japanese petroleum company. Its businesses include exploration, importation, and refining of crude oil; the manufacture and sale of petroleum products, including fuels and lubricants; and other energy-related activities. It is the largest oil company in Japan, and in recent years it has been expanding its operations in other countries.

Its products are sold under the Eneos brand, which is also used for service stations. It also previously operated service stations under the Esso and Mobil brands under license from ExxonMobil. In 2019, as a result of JX Holdings' merger with TonenGeneral Group in 2017 to form JXTG Holdings, both brands were phased out in favour of Eneos EneJet.

History 
In 1999, the company merged with and absorbed the former . The merged company was called  until 2002, when it adopted its present name.

Worldwide operations 
The company has worldwide locations including JX Nippon Oil & Energy USA Inc. in Schaumburg, Illinois, Torrance, California, and Nippon Oil Lubricants (America), LLC, in Childersburg, Alabama.  ENEOS is JXTG Group's corporate brand.  They have brought their premium brand motor oil ENEOS and SUSTINA into the United States recently.  The product line includes the extremely difficult to formulate 0W-50 viscosity oil.  New line of premium full synthetic motor oil SUSTINA is now available in the United States.

NOC employs over 5,500 people, with additional employees from oversea divisions, and operates the following refineries throughout Japan:
Muroran Refinery (Nippon Petroleum Refining Co., Ltd.)
Sendai Refinery (NPRC)
Yokohama Refinery (NPRC)
Negishi Refinery (NPRC)
Mizushima Refinery (NPRC)
Osaka Refinery (NPRC)
Marifu Refinery (NPRC)

Nippon Oil Exploration owns a 5% share of Syncrude, a Canadian oil sands mining company, through its fully owned subsidiary Mocal Energy.

The company also has technical collaboration with Tide Water Oil Co., an Indian petroleum products manufacturer. Superior quality lubricants under the brand name ENEOS are manufactured and marketed in India by Tide Water Oil Co.

2011 earthquake and tsunami
On 11 March 2011, a 145,000-barrel-per-day refinery in Sendai was set ablaze by the Tōhoku earthquake. Workers were evacuated, but tsunami warnings hindered efforts to extinguish the fire until 14 March, when officials planned to do so.

Environmental record
While developing the Rang Don Oil Field and Helang Gas Field NOEX, part of the Nippon Oil Corporation, conducted environmental impact assessments. These assessments helped them implement management plans based on the results of the assessments, specifically, how to reduce the impact of the fields on surrounding sea areas.

In 2005, Nippon Oil and Ebara-Ballard announced they were going to start field testing a 1 kW household proton-exchange membrane fuel cell system that uses coal oil as fuel. It was the world's first household test with the system. The system achieves a greater power-generation efficiency than normal heating. The system can operate in temperatures as low as -10 deg C.

In 2007, Nippon Oil was the recipient of the Nippon Keidanren Chairman's Prize in recognition of its achievements in a number of areas. They were the first in the Japanese petroleum industry to achieve a zero emission status at their refineries. They are also developing fuel cell systems as well as producing and selling sulfur-free fuel. The Rang Dong Oil Field is also one of the biggest  reduction projects in the world. The project utilizes associated gas produced along with crude oil for additional energy production.

Sponsorship

Nippon Oil is a current sponsor of the F.C. Tokyo football club.

It has also sponsored several motor sports teams, such as Team Lexus LeMans ENEOS SC430 in the Japanese Super GT series in the GT500 class.  In the late 1980s and early 1990s JSPC, it sponsored the Trust Racing Team Porsche. From 2005 to 2008, Eneos sponsored the Formula One program of Honda, with British American Racing in 2005,  Honda Racing F1 from 2006 to 2008, and Super Aguri from 2006 to 2007. Since 2014, the Eneos brand has been featured on Kyle Larson's #42 Chevrolet Camaro in the NASCAR Xfinity Series in select races. They also sponsor Akinori Ogata in the NASCAR Camping World Truck Series when he drives the 63 for MB Motorsports. He drove the 63 truck in 2015 and 2016. Eneos is currently a sponsor of Monster Energy Yamaha MotoGP team as a fuel and lubricants supplier since 2012 season and also supplying fuel and lubricants for Pata Yamaha with Brixx WorldSBK World Superbike team since 2016 season.

The company also currently sponsors the 1000km of Palanga endurance race in Lithuania.

References

External links

Eneos Japanese-language website
Eneos English-language website

Companies formerly listed on the Tokyo Stock Exchange
Oil companies based in Tokyo
Chemical companies based in Tokyo
Automotive companies based in Tokyo
Retail companies established in 1888
Non-renewable resource companies established in 1888
Automotive fuel retailers
Japanese brands
Nippon Oil Corporation
Multinational companies headquartered in Japan
Japanese companies established in 1888